Sound of a Rebel is the fourth studio album by the Danish hip hop group Outlandish. It was released in Denmark on 11 May 2009. It is Outlandish's comeback album after four years of the band members working on solo projects.

Music videos
"Rock All Day"Video (Sound Of A Rebel - 2009)
"Feels Like Saving The World"Video (Sound Of A Rebel - 2009)
"Keep The Record On Play"Video (Sound Of A Rebel - 2010)
"Let Off Some Steam"Video (Sound Of A Rebel - 2010)

Track listing

Charts and certifications

Charts

Certifications

References

2009 albums
Outlandish albums